The Italian Union of Postal Workers (UIL POSTE) is a trade union representing workers at Poste italiane.

The union was founded on 21 March 1950, as the Italian Union of Post and Telecommunication Workers.  It affiliated to the recently-founded Italian Labour Union.  By 1965, it had only 9,900 members, but by 2013 this had grown to 29,540.

External links

References

Communications trade unions
Trade unions established in 1950
Trade unions in Italy